Trifurcula globulariae is a moth of the family Nepticulidae. First described by Klimesch in 1975, it is only known from North Macedonia.

The larvae feed on Globularia meridionalis. They mine the leaves of their host plant. The mine consists of a narrow, straight corridor, entirely filled with frass. Later, the corridor widens strongly. Here the frass lies in a heavy, irregular, often interrupted black line.

External links
bladmineerders.nl
Fauna Europaea

Nepticulidae
Moths of Europe
Moths described in 1975